Shea Evans Roberts (born July 24, 1970) is an American politician from Georgia. Roberts is a Democratic member of Georgia House of Representatives for District 52.

References

Democratic Party members of the Georgia House of Representatives
21st-century American politicians
Living people
1970 births